Mother's milk is milk produced by mammary glands located in the breast of a human female to feed a young child.

Mother's Milk may also refer to:

Entertainment

 [[Mother's Milk (album)|Mother's Milk (album)]], an album by Red Hot Chili Peppers
 Mother's Milk Tour, 1989–1990 worldwide concert tour
 Mother's Milk (novel), by Edward St Aubyn
 Mother's Milk (film), 2011
 Mother's Milk (Law & Order), an episode of the television series Law & Order Mother's Milk (character), a character in comic book and television series The Boys''